Y-DNA haplogroups in populations of Europe are haplogroups of the male Y-chromosome found in European populations.

Frequencies in European ethnic groups 

The table below shows the human Y-chromosome DNA haplogroups, based on relevant studies, for various ethnic and other notable groups from Europe. The samples are taken from individuals identified with the ethnic and linguistic designations shown in the first two columns; the third column gives the sample size studied; and the other columns give the percentage for each particular haplogroup (ethnic groups from the North Caucasus, although technically located in Europe, are considered in their own article where they are placed alongside populations of the South Caucasus for the purpose of conserving space).

Note: The converted frequency of Haplogroup 2,  including modern haplogroups I, G and sometimes J from some old studies conducted before 2004 may lead to unsubstantial frequencies below.

Notes

Chronological development of haplogroups

See also 
Europe
Genetic history of Europe
Ethnic groups in Europe
Demographics of Europe
Y-DNA haplogroups by population
Y-DNA haplogroups in populations of the Near East
Y-DNA haplogroups in populations of North Africa
Y-DNA haplogroups in populations of Sub-Saharan Africa
Y-DNA haplogroups in populations of the Caucasus
Y-DNA haplogroups in populations of South Asia
Y-DNA haplogroups in populations of East and Southeast Asia
Y-DNA haplogroups in populations of Oceania
Y-DNA haplogroups in populations of Central and North Asia
Y-DNA haplogroups in indigenous peoples of the Americas

References

External links 
 
Distribution of European Y-chromosome DNA (Y-DNA) haplogroups by country in percentage. 2004-2021 Eupedia

Europe
Genetic history of Europe